Cruelty and the Beast is the third studio album by English extreme metal band Cradle of Filth. It is a concept album based on the legend of the Hungarian "blood countess" Elizabeth Báthory and features guest narration by actress Ingrid Pitt in-character as Báthory, a role she first played in the Hammer Horror film Countess Dracula in 1971. It was released on 5 May 1998 by record label Music for Nations.

The album, while positively received, was noted for its poor production by fans, critics and members of the band alike. A remixed and remastered edition, titled Cruelty and the Beast – Re-Mistressed, was released in November 2019.

In November 2021, during an AMA with Dani Filth on reddit, it was revealed that the track, "Bathory Aria" was the track Dani was most proud of out of the band's entire catalog.

Recording and production 
This was the last Cradle of Filth album to feature guitarist and songwriter Stuart Anstis, keyboardist Lecter and drummer Nicholas Barker.

The production and mixing for Cruelty and the Beast has attracted some criticism, particularly for the sound quality of the drumming. Sarah Jezebel Deva revealed on the band's official messageboards: "[The production is] absolute rubbish. I remember when I first heard it – Dani played it – I walked out with tears in my eyes. I had spent twenty-five hours working in the studio on that album and it sounded like I had my head in a toilet [...] most of my vocals you couldn't hear." After walking out of the room after Dani played it to her, she claimed to have bumped into drummer Nicholas Barker, who also expressed his dissatisfaction. In an interview with Scars and Guitars in 2020, Barker stated he cried when he heard the mix and demanded that the album release be postponed. Barker also stated that the main songwriters, Stuart Anstis, Les Smith and himself wanted either Andy Sneap or Peter Tagtgren to record the album and were overridden by the label.

Release 
Released on 5 May 1998 by record label Music for Nations, Cruelty and the Beast reached number 48 in the UK Albums Chart.

The album was reissued in a two-disc Special Edition by Koch in 2001 and by The End in 2012.

A completely remixed and remastered re-release of the album was planned for its 20th anniversary in late 2018. Producer Scott Atkins confirmed on his Instagram page on 9 October 2018 that the remix had been completed:
"Vinyl test pressings have arrived and all the mixes sent off. It’s been an endeavour. Lots of restoration work needed to be done, noise reduction, hum and hiss, crosstalk and bleed. No additional recording has taken place, myself and Dani wanted it faithful to the original just sonically better. The songs are really killer and finally have some real weight to them, which the original sorely lacked." The following May, however, Atkins updated that unspecified "legal issues" continued to delay the release. With these issues apparently ironed out, a November 2019 release date for the newly titled Cruelty and the Beast: Remistressed was announced in late August 2019.

Reception 

The album ranked tenth in Kerrang!'s list of the top ten "essential black metal" albums in 2000.

Track listing

Personnel 
 Cradle of Filth
 Dani Filth – lead vocals
 Stuart Anstis – lead guitar
 Gian Pyres – rhythm guitar
 Robin Graves – bass
 Lecter – keyboards
 Nicholas Barker – drums
 Sarah Jezebel Deva – backing vocals

 Guest/session musicians
 Danielle Cneajna Cottington – backing vocals
 Ingrid Pitt – Lady Bathory's narration on "The Twisted Nails of Faith" and Bathory Aria's "Eyes That Witnessed Madness"

 Production
Jan Peter Genkel – producer
Dan Spriggs – engineer
Mike Exeter – Production and additional engineering
Mark Harwood – orchestral recordings at Springvale Studios, Ipswich
Stu Williamson – sleeve photography
Louisa Morando - cover art model

Charts

References

External links 
 

Cradle of Filth albums
1998 albums
Concept albums
Music for Nations albums
Cultural depictions of Elizabeth Báthory